Islamic Revolutionary Guard Corps Research and Self-Sufficiency Jihad Organization is a R&D unit institution established in 1993. According to IRGC, it was attacked in 2021.
It has buildings based in Isfahan and Tehran.

It has been sanctioned by US Treasury since July 2017 through Executive Order 13224.

Products
It develops and manufactures ground penetrating radar, communications system, weaponry, combat vehicles, electronic cyberwarfare equipment. Its main contractors include Ministry of Defence and Armed Forces Logistics , Imam Hossein University

References 

Islamic Revolutionary Guard Corps
Foundations based in Iran